As-Suwaidi (as-Suwaydi, al-Suwaidi, etc.) is an Arabic nisbat derived from suwayd (an Arabic name derived from a root s-w-d "black", or from the Arabic name of Sweden).

People
As-Suwaydi (physician), a medieval physician (d. 1292) 
Tawfiq al-Suwaidi (1892-1968), Iraqi politician
Naji al-Suwaidi (1882 – 1942), Iraqi politician
Khalid Habash Al-Suwaidi (born 1984), a Qatari athlete
 a nisba referencing the Syrian As-Suwayda Governorate
 a nisba meaning "from Sweden" used as nom de guerre (kunya) by a number of Islamic terrorists from or based in Sweden, see Islam in Sweden

Places
As-Suwaidi (Riyadh), a district of Riyadh Province, Saudi Arabia.
 Bayt As Suwaydi, Yemen

See also
Suwayd (disambiguation)

Arabic-language surnames